Klaus Zink (born 20 January 1936 in Plauen) is a former German footballer who scored 5 goals in 1958–59 European Cup.

References

1936 births
Living people
German footballers
Association football forwards
FC Erzgebirge Aue players
People from Plauen
Footballers from Saxony